Mary Louise Ware ( Smith; born 1937) is an African-American civil rights activist. She was arrested in October 1955 at the age of 18 in Montgomery, Alabama for refusing to give up her seat on the segregated bus system. She is one of several women who were arrested for this offense prior to Rosa Parks that year. Parks was the figure around whom the Montgomery bus boycott was organized, starting December 5, 1955.

On February 1, 1956, Smith was one of five women named as plaintiffs in the federal civil suit, Browder v. Gayle, challenging the constitutionality of the state and local bus segregation laws. On June 13, 1956, a three-judge panel of the United States District Court ruled that the laws were unconstitutional. The ruling was upheld by the United States Supreme Court on November 13 in a landmark decision, and in December it declined to reconsider. On December 20, 1956, the Supreme Court ordered Alabama to desegregate its buses and the Montgomery bus boycott ended.

Early life and education

Mary Louise Smith was born in Montgomery, Alabama into a Catholic family. She and all her siblings attended and graduated from St. Jude Educational Institute. She was baptized at St. Jude's Church, where she was a parishioner.

At the age of 18, on October 21, 1955, Smith was returning home on the Montgomery city bus, and was ordered to relinquish her seat to a white passenger who had boarded later. She refused to do so and was arrested. She was charged with failure to obey segregation orders, some 40 days before the arrest of Rosa Parks on similar charges. Her father bailed her out of jail and paid her nine-dollar fine. The incident was initially known only to family and neighbors.

Later a cousin, at a mass meeting to support a planned bus boycott, discussed her case with organizers. Attorney Fred Gray asked Smith and her father to become plaintiffs in a civil rights class-action lawsuit to end segregated seating on city buses. Her father agreed, for he wanted justice.

Browder v. Gayle

On February 1, 1956, Gray and other attorneys filed a civil suit, Browder v. Gayle in the United States District Court, challenging state and local laws on bus segregation. Smith was one of five plaintiffs, including Aurelia Browder, Claudette Colvin, Susie McDonald, and Jeanetta Reese. (Reese left the case that month because of intimidation.) The women, other than Reese, testified before a three-judge panel, and on June 13, 1956, the court ruled that the laws were unconstitutional, based on equal protection under the Fourteenth Amendment.

Appealed by the city and state, the case made its way to the United States Supreme Court. On November 13, 1956, it affirmed the lower court's ruling. On December 17, it declined an appeal by the city and state to reconsider, and on December 20 ordered the state to desegregate its buses. This ended the Montgomery bus boycott with success.

Later years
Smith married a Mr. Ware and they had four children together. They later divorced. Smith Ware continued to work for civil rights beyond the boycott and trial. For instance, she worked on voting rights campaigns before passage of the federal Voting Rights Act of 1965, and participated in the 1963  March on Washington. In 1969, Smith contacted  civil rights attorney Morris Dees to sue the Montgomery YMCA for not allowing her and her sister's children into their summer camp program.

Smith is active with her 12 grandchildren and great-grandchildren.  She enjoys reading, and she is active in several of her church auxiliaries and senior citizen clubs.

In 1995, Smith was told by a news reporter, that she had been discussed as being a test case by black leaders in relation to organizing a bus boycott. She was told they had not picked her because her father was said to be an alcoholic, and they did not want any grounds for criticism of participants.  Smith said this was untrue, and she was bothered more by the rumor than by having had her own contributions overlooked. Given the national attention commanded by the Montgomery bus boycott, Rosa Parks is the woman most associated with the issue. Smith was proud to be among the four women who took their case to the United States Supreme Court.

When Rosa Parks died in October 2005, Smith Ware, then 68, attended the memorial service in Montgomery. "I had to pay my tribute to her," Ware said. "She was our role model."

Tributes
Rita Dove, a United States poet laureate, mentions Mary Louise Smith in her poem "The Enactment", in her collection, On the Bus with Rosa Parks (1999). She also referred to the then-young activist in her magazine article "The Torchbearer Rosa Parks".
 In 2019 a statue of Rosa Parks was unveiled in Montgomery, Alabama, and four granite markers were also unveiled near the statue on the same day to honor four plaintiffs in Browder v. Gayle, including Mary Louise Smith. Smith also took part in the unveiling ceremony.

See also

Aurelia Browder
Claudette Colvin
Susie McDonald
Irene Morgan
Rosa Parks

References

External links

Activists for African-American civil rights
1937 births
Living people
Activists from Montgomery, Alabama
African-American Catholics
Protests in Alabama
Catholics from Alabama